Edward Allen Brotherton, 1st Baron Brotherton (1 April 1856 – 21 October 1930), known as Sir Edward Brotherton, Bt, between 1918 and 1929, was an industrialist in Wakefield, West Yorkshire, England and a benefactor to the University of Leeds and other causes. He was also a Conservative Party politician, and sat in the House of Commons between 1902 and 1922.

Life 
Edward Allen Brotherton was born 1 April 1856 at 2 Tiverton Place, Ardwick Green, Manchester to Theophilus Brotherton, a yarn agent, and Sarah née O'Donnell. He is also related to educational reformer Edward Brotherton and the 1st MP for Salford, Joseph Brotherton.

At the age of 14 Brotherton made an unsuccessful attempt to go to sea which lasted only two days. He left school at 15 working at a hardware store before finding a position as an assistant at a chemical laboratory. At this time, he also attended evening classes in chemistry taught by Henry Roscoe at Owens College, Manchester. At 19 he began work at a chemical works in Wakefield, West Yorkshire.

In 1878 Brotherton, with backing from his family, became the founding partner of Wakefield company Dyson Brothers and Brotherton. The company manufactured ammonium sulphate, taking advantage of plentiful supplies of ammoniacal liquor produced by the local coal and gas industry and supplied ammonia to the textile industry and for use in the extraction of gold.

In 1882 Brotherton married Mary Jane Brookes, daughter of artist and designer Warwick Brookes. Sadly their marriage was short-lived as Mary died in childbirth in 1883. The child, a daughter also died. Brotherton never remarried and kept in contact with Mary's family for the rest of his life.

In 1889 Brotherton's partnership with the Dyson brothers ended and he continued the business alone under the name Brotherton and Co. The company would go on to become one of the largest private chemical companies in the country expanding into coal tar distillation and manufacturing products such as pitch, TNT and creosote during the First World War. The business also moved from headquarters in Wakefield to City Chambers, Leeds. Brotherton's nephew Charles Ratcliffe, husband of Dorothy Una Ratcliffe, later succeeded his uncle as head of the business and took the name Brotherton. The company continued after Brotherton's death until 1957 when it was acquired by British Chrome and Chemicals. The company later traded under various names such as Brotherton Chemicals Ltd, Brotherton Speciality Products Ltd and Brotherton Esseco Ltd.

Brotherton spent his later years at Roundhay Hall, Leeds (now Spire Leeds Hospital) and Kirkham Hall, Yorkshire where he died on 21 October 1930. His burial at Lawnswood Cemetery, Leeds on 24 October 1930 was attended only by the male members of his family, at his stipulation.

Collecting 
During his lifetime Brotherton amassed an impressive collection including books, manuscripts and letters. His first foray into collecting was, however, unsuccessful. In February 1922 he attempted to buy a 15th-century Towneley manuscript of Wakefield Mystery Plays but was outbid by the American book dealer A.S.W. Rosenbach. His niece, Dorothy Una Ratcliffe, was so disappointed by the loss that Brotherton took her to the bookseller Bernard Quaritch where they bought a first edition of Andrew Marvell's Miscellaneous Poems instead. Aided and encouraged by Dorothy, Brotherton continued to add to what would become a large and varied collection and later employed J Alexander Symington as librarian.  In 1926 Brotherton published a catalogue of the highlights of the collection. Brotherton enjoyed showing his treasures to visitors to his home and welcomed many scholars to his private library.

Brotherton Library 

In 1927 Brotherton donated £100,00 to the University of Leeds for a new library. In June 1930, in one of his last public acts, he laid the foundation stone for the building, at the same time announcing that he would bequeath his collection of books and manuscripts to the university. The Brotherton Library opened in 1936 and still houses his collection which includes 35,000 books, 400 manuscripts, 4,000 deeds and 30,000 letters. On his death Brotherton's will also revealed a further bequest of £100,00 to the university.

Today the Brotherton Circle honours the generosity of alumni and friends who include a gift to the University of Leeds in their will.

Political career and honours 
Brotherton was elected as Alderman/Councillor for Leeds City from 1911 to 1915 and was Lord Mayor of Leeds in 1913–14.
Brotherton was also an Alderman of Wakefield from 1901, and was a Member of Parliament (MP) for Wakefield 1902–1910 and 1918–1922.  He was first elected at a by-election in March 1902, after his predecessor Lord Milton inherited a peerage on the death of his grandfather. He was created a Baronet, of Wakefield in the West Riding of the County of York, in 1918 and raised to the peerage as Baron Brotherton, of Wakefield in the County of York, in 1929, for "political, public and charitable causes". The titles became extinct on his death in October 1930, aged 74.

During the time that Brotherton served as Lord Mayor of Leeds his niece, Dorothy Una Ratcliffe, took the role of Lady Mayoress. As Lord Mayor he raised the West Yorkshire Regiment (Leeds Pals) at his own expense, in return receiving the title of Honorary Colonel.

References

External links
 
 Biography on website of Brotherton Esseco
  A podcast about a 14th-century manuscript from the Brotherton collection at the University of Leeds
Audio Podcast from Astrotalkuk.org. A rediscovery of a copy of the Almagest in the special collections of the Brotherton Library in the University of Leeds.
 Lord Brotherton of Wakefield (1856-1930), Leeds University Library's greatest benefactor

1856 births
1930 deaths
English businesspeople
People from Ardwick
People associated with the University of Leeds
Conservative Party (UK) MPs for English constituencies
UK MPs 1900–1906
UK MPs 1906–1910
UK MPs 1918–1922
UK MPs who were granted peerages
English book and manuscript collectors
Politics of Wakefield
Barons in the Peerage of the United Kingdom
Mayors of Leeds
Barons created by George V